Paldo Bibim Men is a brand of brothless ramyeon (ramen) with sweet and spicy seasoning sauce to mix with noodles, produced by Korea Yakult PalDo (팔도) since 1984. It is the oldest brothless ramyeon in Korea. In 2013, Paldo Bibim Men was the tenth-ranked for ramyeon sales in South Korea, with revenues of 47 billion won that year.
Paldo bibim noodles are cooked in hot water, rinsed in cold water and rubbed with the sauce.

See also
List of instant noodle brands

References

External links
The official website of PalDo (English)
PalDo Product-Instant Noodles, Bibim Men page (English)
Calories in Paldo Bibim Men Oriental Style Noodle, Korean Spicy Taste - Nutrition Facts

South Korean brands
Instant noodle brands